Pseudognaphalium canescens (syn. Gnaphalium canescens) is a species of flowering plant in the family Asteraceae known by the common name Wright's cudweed.

It is native to western North America from western Canada to northern Mexico. It can be found in many habitats, from mountains to plateau to coastline. The many-branched stem is erect to a maximum height of around a meter. It is gray-green and woolly with many narrow leaves. Atop the stem branches are inflorescences of several pointed oval-shaped pale yellowish, cream, or white flower heads. Each woolly head is a few millimeters across and contains many tiny flowers.

External links
Jepson Manual Treatment
USDA Plants Profile
Flora of North America

UC Photos gallery

canescens
Flora of the Western United States
Flora of Western Canada
Flora of California
Flora of Baja California
Natural history of the California chaparral and woodlands
Flora without expected TNC conservation status